The following is a discography of production by American rapper and record producer Earl Sweatshirt. He was often credited as randomblackdude in his early years of producing, however, he has apparently dropped the pseudonym, now being credited as Earl Sweatshirt or even sometimes as his real name Thebe Kgositsile.

2009

Sly Tendencies – Kitchen Cutlery
 11. "Number 4 (Instrumental)"

2012

Earl Sweatshirt
 "Chum" (produced with Christian Rich and Chad Hugo)

2013

Kilo Kish – K+
04. "Trappin'" (featuring Vince Staples)

Mac Miller – Watching Movies with the Sound Off
01. "The Star Room"
03. "I'm Not Real" (featuring Earl Sweatshirt)

Dash – V.I.C.E.S
12. "Whalé" (featuring Ab-Soul and Retch)

Earl Sweatshirt – Doris
03. "20 Wave Caps" (featuring Domo Genesis) (produced with Samiyam)
04. "Sunday" (featuring Frank Ocean) (produced with Frank Ocean)
05. "Hive" (featuring Vince Staples and Casey Veggies) (produced with Matt Martians)
06. "Chum" (produced with Christian Rich and Chad Hugo)
09. "523"
10. "Uncle Al" (produced with The Alchemist)
11. "Guild" (featuring Mac Miller)

Delusional Thomas – Delusional Thomas
04. "Bill" (featuring Earl Sweatshirt and Bill) (produced with Larry Fisherman)

2014

Earl Sweatshirt
 "Nebraska" (featuring Mac Miller and Vince Staples)

Mac Miller – Faces
09. "Polo Jeans" (featuring Earl Sweatshirt and Ab-Soul)
23. "New Faces v2" (featuring Earl Sweatshirt and Dash)

Mac Miller
 "The Star Room (OG Version)"

Earl Sweatshirt
 "Snakeskin Shirt (Instrumental)"

Matt Martians
 "Horn"

Lil Herb
 "Knucklehead" (featuring Earl Sweatshirt)

2015

Mike G – Award Tour II
05. "Jameson" (produced with Jack Frost)

Earl Sweatshirt – I Don't Like Shit, I Don't Go Outside
01. "Huey" 
02. "Mantra"
03. "Faucet"
04. "Grief"
06. "Grown Ups" (featuring Dash)
07. "AM // Radio" (featuring Wiki)
08. "Inside"
09. "DNA" (featuring Na'kel)
10. "Wool" (featuring Vince Staples)

Earl Sweatshirt – Solace
 01. "Solace"

Dash – 17 More Minutes
12. "Komin' Klean"

Njomza and Mac Miller
 "Creatures of the Night" (featuring Delusional Thomas)

2016

Earl Sweatshirt
 "Bary"
 "Skrt Skrt"
 "Pelicula"

Currensy and The Alchemist – The Carrollton Heist: Remixed
 07. "The Mack Book Remix"

Mach-Hommy
 "Henrietta Lax"

2017

Denmark Vessey – Martin Lucid Dream 
 10. "Snowing in LA"

Tha God Fahim – Dump Gawd
  06. "Don't Go Summer"

Mach-Hommy – Dump Gawd: Hommy Edition 
 04. "Allen Iverson" (featuring Heem Stogied)
 06. "DNA Swab" (featuring Tha God Fahim)
 07. "Nothin' But Net" (featuring Your Old Droog)

Wiki – No Mountains in Manhattan 
  11. "Wiki New Written" 
  16. "Leppy Coqui" (produced with Alex Epton and Tony Seltzer)

Medhane – Do For Self 
 05. "Agoura134"

Tha God Fahim – Dump Goat
  12. "Don't Go Summer"

Mach-Hommy – Fete Des Morts AKA Dia De Los Muertos 
 01. "Henrietta Lax"
 02. "TTFN" (featuring JuJu Gotti)
 04. "Basin Bleu"
 05. "Carpe DM" (featuring Kungg Fuu)
 06. "Manje Midi"
 07. "Bride of The Water G-d"
 08. "THEJIGISUP"

2018

Denmark Vessey – Sun Go Nova 
 01. "Zzzzz" (featuring ADaD)
 02. "Trustfall"
 05. "Sellout" (featuring DrxQuinnx and Vic Spencer)

Mach-Hommy and Tha God Fahim – Notorious Dump Legends
03. "Baleen Pocketknife"

Earl Sweatshirt – Some Rap Songs 
 01.  "Shattered Dreams"
 02.  "Red Water"
 03.  "Cold Summers"
 06.  "Ontheway!" (featuring Standing on the Corner)
 09.  "Loosie"
 11.  "Eclipse"
 12.  "Veins"
 13.  "Playing Possum" (featuring Cheryl Harris and Keorapetse Kgositsile)
 14.  "Peanut"
 15.  "Riot!" (produced with Shamel of SOTC)

Tha God Fahim – Dump Truck 7
 04. "Location: State of Mind"

2019

Lucki – Freewave 3
 13. "All In"

Solange – When I Get Home
 07. "Dreams"

Mach-Hommy – Wap Konn Jòj!
 04. "Time Face"
 06. "Mittrom" (featuring Earl Sweatshirt)

Mavi – Let the Sun Talk 
08. "Sense"

Earl Sweatshirt – Feet of Clay 
 01. "74"
 02. "East"
 04. "OD"
 06. "Tisk Tisk / Cookies"
 07. "4N" (featuring Mach-Hommy)

2020

Armand Hammer – Shrines 
 01. "Bitter Cassava" (featuring Pink Siifu)

Mach-Hommy – Mach's Hard Lemonade 
 02. "Soon Jah Due" (featuring Earl Sweatshirt) 
 05. "Photocopy Sloppy (Dump Fraud)"

2021

Armand Hammer and The Alchemist – Haram 
 06. "God's Feet"

Huey Jefferson - The Boy II: Solastalgia 

 06. "Cocky"

2022

Earl Sweatshirt – Sick! 
 03. "Sick!" 
 05. "Tabula Rasa" (featuring Armand Hammer) 
 08. "God Laughs"

Armand Hammer - WHT LBL 
 06. "Flummox"
 07. "¿Tu Tienes WiFi?"

See also
 Earl Sweatshirt discography

References

External links
 
 
 
 

Discographies of American artists
Production discographies
Production discography